Jill Powell (born 19 January 1957) is an English former cricketer who played as a right-handed batter and right-arm medium bowler. She played one Women's Test match and one One Day International for England in 1979. Her twin sister Jane also represented England. She played domestic cricket for Kent and Western Australia.

References

External links
 

1957 births
Living people
Cricketers from Sheffield
England women Test cricketers
England women One Day International cricketers
Kent women cricketers
Western Australia women cricketers